Muhammad Affash al-Adwan (born 1943) is a retired Jordanian Ambassador he was Minister of Information.

Career
From 1977 to 1982 he was Vice President Jordan Valley Authority.
From 1982 to 1985 he was Director of Office of Queen Noor of Jordan.
From 1985 to 1989 he was Ambassador in Madrid (Spain).
From 1990 to  he was ambassador in Moscow with concurrent non resident Diplomatic accreditation in Helsinki (Finland) and Warsaw. Poland.
From  to  he was Jordanian Chief of Protocol.
From  to  he was Minister of tourism and Antiquities.
From 2001 to 2003 he was Minister of State for Political Affairs and Information.

References

1943 births
Living people
Ambassadors of Jordan to Spain
Ambassadors of Jordan to the Soviet Union
Information ministers of Jordan
Tourism ministers of Jordan
Jordanian Chief of Protocol
Members of the Senate of Jordan